Robert Emmet Burke (August 1, 1847 – June 5, 1901) was a U.S. Representative from Texas.

Early years

Robert Emmet Burke was born near Dadeville, Alabama, and attended nearby public schools. He moved to Jefferson, Texas, in 1866.

Military service

Burke enlisted as a private in Confederate States Army, Company D 10th Georgia Regiment before the age of sixteen and served throughout the Civil War.

Public service

Robert Emmet Burke studied law. He was admitted to the bar in November 1870 and commenced practice in Dallas, Texas, in 1871. He served as judge of Dallas County 1878–1888. He served as judge of the fourteenth judicial district of Texas 1888–1896.

Burke was elected as a Democrat to the Fifty-fifth, Fifty-sixth, and Fifty-seventh Congresses and served from March 4, 1897.

Death

Robert Emmet Burke died in Dallas, Texas, June 5, 1901, and was interred in Greenwood Cemetery.

Bibliography

See also
List of United States Congress members who died in office (1900–49)

References

Sources

 Biography from the Handbook of Texas Online
 Memorial addresses on the life and character of Robert E. Burke, late a representative from Texas delivered in the House of Representatives and Senate frontispiece 1902

1847 births
1901 deaths
People from Dadeville, Alabama
Confederate States Army soldiers
Dallas City Council members
Democratic Party members of the United States House of Representatives from Texas
19th-century American politicians
People from Jefferson, Texas